TurboDOS is a multi user CP/M like operating system for the Z80 and 8086 CPUs developed by Software 2000 Inc.

It was released around 1982 for S100 bus based systems such as the NorthStar Horizon and the Commercial Systems line of the multiprocessor systems including the CSI-50, CSI-75, SCI-100 and CSI-150.

The multiprocessor nature of TurboDOS is its most unusual feature. Unlike other operating systems of its time where networking of processors was either an afterthought, or which only support a file transfer protocol, TurboDOS was designed from the ground up as a multiprocessor operating system.

It is modular in construction, with the operating system generation based on a  relocating, linking, loader  program. This makes the incorporation of different  hardware driver modules quite easy, particularly  for  bus-oriented machines, such as the IEEE-696 (S-100) bus which was commonly used for TurboDOS systems.

Architecture
TurboDOS is highly modular, consisting of more than forty separate functional modules distributed in relocatable form. These modules are "building blocks" that you can combine in various ways to produce a family of compatible operating systems. This section describes the modules in detail, and describes how to combine them in various configurations.

Possible TurboDOS configurations include:
 single-user without spooling
 single-user with spooling
 network server
 simple network user (no local disks)
 complex network user (with local disks)

Numerous subtle variations are possible in each of these categories.

Module hierarchy
The architecture of TurboDOS can be viewed as a three-level hierarchy. The highest level of the hierarchy is the process level. TurboDOS can support many concurrent processes at this level. The intermediate level of the hierarchy is the kernel level. The kernel supports the 93 C-functions and T-functions, and controls the sharing of computer resources such as processor time, memory, peripheral devices, and disk files. Processes make requests of the kernel through the entrypoint module OSNTRY, which decodes each C-function and T-function by number and invokes the appropriate kernel module.

The C functions include the CP/M BDOS functions and selected MP/M functions.

The lowest level of the hierarchy is the driver level, and contains all the device-dependent drivers necessary to interface TurboDOS to the particular hardware being used. Drivers must be provided for all peripherals, including console, printers, disks, communications channels, and network interface.

Drivers are also required for the real-time clock (or other periodic interrupt source), and for bank-switched memory (if applicable).

TurboDOS is designed to interface with almost any kind of peripheral hardware. It operates most efficiently with interrupt-driven, DMA-type interfaces, but can also work fine using polled and programmed-I/O devices.

TurboDOS loader
The TurboDOS loader OSLOAD.COM is a program containing an abbreviated version of the kernel and drivers. Its purpose is to load the full TurboDOS operating system from a disk file (OSSERVER.SYS) into memory at each system cold-start.

System generation
The functional modules are distributed in relocatable format (.REL) and the GEN command is a specialized linker which builds an executable version of the system.

Commands
TurboDOS has no "resident" commands. All commands are executable files. The standard commands are:

External links
 The TurboDOS Museum
 TUG Newsletters
 Z80 Implementors Guide (pdf)
 The TurboDOS Operating System

CP/M
Microcomputer software
Disk operating systems